Latin freestyle is a form of American electronic dance music of electro-funk, post-disco, Italo disco, hip-hop origins, that is popular within Latino communities. This is a list of notable freestyle music groups, musicians, songs and albums.

History

1980s

1990s

Examples of albums

Compilations

Examples of musicians

TKA (1980s–2000s) 
Trilogy (1980s–1990s) 
Nancy Martinez
Denise Lopez
Planet Patrol (1980s)
Stevie B (1980s–2000s) 
Brenda K. Starr (1980s–2000s) 
The Cover Girls (1980s–2000s) 
Exposé (1980s–2000s) 
Lil Suzy (1990s) 
Johnny O. (1980s–2000s)
Trinere (1980s–1990s) 
Jocelyn Enriquez (1990s–2000s) 
Lisa Lisa & Cult Jam(80s) 
K7 (1980s–2000s) 
Lisa Lisa(1980s–2000s) 
Sweet Sensation (1980s–1990s) 
George Lamond (1980s–2000s) 
Judy Torres (1980s–2000s) 
All City (1990s) 
Collage (1980s–2000s) 
Rochelle (1990s–2000s) 
Spanish Fly (1990s–2000s)
Vla Paris & Sarina (1990s) 
Collage & Denine (1990s)
Hanson & Davis (1980s)

References 

Lists of dance musicians
Latin freestyle
Latin freestyle